Ocros can refer to a city, a district and a province in Peru.

For the use of the term in a specific setting, see:

Ocros for the town in Peru.
Ocros Province for the province in the Ancash Region.
Ocros District, Ocros for the district in the Ocros province.
Ocros District, Huamanga for the district in the Huamanga province.